Savan may refer to:
 Savan (island), one of the Grenadine islands of St Vincent
 Savan, Kurdistan, a village in Iran
 Savan, West Azerbaijan, a village in Iran
 Savan-e Jadid, a village in Iran
 Savan Kotecha, songwriter
 David Savan, professor